The Chicago Botanic Garden is a  living plant museum situated on nine islands in the Cook County Forest Preserves. It features 27 display gardens in four natural habitats: McDonald Woods, Dixon Prairie, Skokie River Corridor, and Lakes and Shores. The garden is open every day of the year. An admission fee has been approved to start in 2022, not to exceed $35.

The Chicago Botanic Garden is owned by the Forest Preserve District of Cook County, and managed by the Chicago Horticultural Society. It opened to the public in 1972, and is home to the Joseph Regenstein Jr. School of the Chicago Botanic Garden, offering a number of classes and certificate programs.

The Chicago Botanic Garden is accredited by the American Alliance of Museums and is a member of the American Public Gardens Association (APGA).

Garden facts
The Chicago Botanic Garden has 50,000 members, the largest membership of any U.S. public garden, and is Chicago's 7th largest cultural institution and 12th-ranking tourist attraction.

The 25 display gardens and four natural habitats include:

The Aquatic Garden
Bonsai Collection
The Bulb Garden
The Grunsfeld Children's Growing Garden
The Circle Garden
Crescent Garden
Dwarf Conifer Garden
Enabling Garden
English Oak Meadow
English Walled Garden
Esplanade
Evening Island
Regenstein Fruit & Vegetable Garden
Great Basin & Water Gardens
Greenhouses
The Green Roof
Heritage Garden
Kleinman Family Cove
Lakeside Garden
Landscape Gardens
Elizabeth Hubert Malott Japanese Garden
Mary Mix McDonald Woods
The Plant Evaluation Gardens
Suzanne S. Dixon Prairie
Native Plant Garden
Model Railroad Garden
The Bruce Krasberg Rose Garden
Sensory Garden
Skokie River
Spider Island
Waterfall Garden

Architecture

The architectural design for the Chicago Botanic Garden began with the creation of the master plan by John O. Simonds and Geoffrey Rausch. Several famous buildings have been designed by well-known architects since 1976.

1976, Education Center, Edward Larabee Barnes
1982, Japanese Garden, Koichi Kawana
1983, Heritage Garden, Geoffrey Rausch
2004, Esplande, Dan Kiley
2009, Conservation Science Center, Booth Hansen

Conservation

The Chicago Botanic Garden opened the Daniel F. and Ada L. Rice Plant Conservation Science Center, located at the south end of the garden, to the public on September 23, 2009. In September 2010, the Plant Science Center earned a Gold LEED (Leadership in Energy and Environmental Design) rating from the U.S. Green Building Council for its sustainable design.

The Chicago Botanic Garden conserves rare plant species, and works with regional, national and international organizations on behalf of plant conservation. The garden is a partner in the Seeds of Success project, a branch of the Millennium Seed Bank Partnership managed by the Royal Botanic Gardens, Kew. The goal is to collect 10,000 seeds from each of 1,500 native species of the Midwest for conservation and restoration efforts. The garden is also a partner in the Plants of Concern initiative to monitor rare species in Northeastern Illinois.

The garden is a member of Chicago Wilderness, a consortium of 200 local institutions dedicated to preserving and restoring Chicago's natural areas, as well as the Center for Plant Conservation, a group of 30 other botanic gardens and arboreta committed to conserving rare plants from their regions.

Education

Degree programs offered at the School of the Chicago Botanic Garden:
L.E.A.P. Ph.D. Program – Landscapes, Ecological and Anthropogenic Processes (LEAP) is a Ph.D. program offered by the University of Illinois at Chicago in partnership with the Chicago Botanic Garden.
University of Chicago Committee on Evolutionary Biology Ph.D. Program
University of Illinois Chicago Ecology & Evolution Group Ph.D. Program

Certificate programs offered at the School of the Chicago Botanic Garden:
Photography 
Horticultural Therapy 
Midwest Gardening 
Professional Gardener 
Garden Design 
Botanical Arts 
Healthcare Garden Design 
Ornamental Plant Materials

Other educational programs available at the garden include the Green Youth Farm, the Windy City Harvest, and the Cook County Sheriff's Vocational Rehabilitation Impact Center.

World Environment Day (2008)

In 2008, the Chicago Botanic Garden was chosen by the United Nations Environment Programme (UNEP) as the North American host for World Environment Day with the theme "CO2—Kick the Habit!: Towards a Low Carbon Economy".

Over 30 nonprofit, academic, cultural, and environmental organizations participated in the "Knowledge and Action Marketplace" on the garden's Esplanade. Displays and representatives discussed products to help green homes, local carpools, volunteer and community conservation programs, classes on green gardening, the use of CFL light bulbs, vehicles that run on used vegetable oil, and appliances that pop popcorn using solar energy.

Organizations participating in the event included:

the Center for Neighborhood Technology, offering car-sharing information
CNT Energy, working with ComEd to provide information about Watt Spot, a program to assist homeowners who want to pay market price for electricity
Northern Illinois Energy Project, who provided free CFL bulbs
Chicago Wilderness and Openlands, who provided information about local conservation and restoration programs
Horrigan Urban Forest Products, who highlighted the best uses for reclaimed wood from urban trees

The garden hosted its first International Climate Change Forum on that day, featuring national and international experts, including Dr. Ashok Khosla, former chairman on the UNEP; Fred Krupp, president of the Environmental Defense Fund; Mary Grade, former regional administrator for EPA region 5; Suzanne Malec-McKenna, commissioner of the Department of the Environment for the City of Chicago; John Rowe, chief executive officer of the Exelon Corporation; Arthur J. Gibson, vice president of environment, health & safety for Baxter International; and Arthur Armishaw, chief technology and services officer for HSBC—North America.

On June 5 of each year, the garden and other venues around the world highlight resources and initiatives that promote low carbon economies and lifestyles, such as improved energy efficiency, alternative energy sources, forest conservation, and eco-friendly consumption.

Sustainability
The first generation of sustainable gardens at the Chicago Botanic Garden were the victory gardens of World Wars I and II. Today's gardens incorporate food and paper scrap composting, sustainable irrigation, and a minimal use of fertilizer and pesticides. The Chicago Botanic Garden also encourages others to garden sustainably by composting food waste, installing backyard rain barrels, using native plants, removing invasive species, and establishing perennials. The Windy City Harvest program offers workshops in sustainable urban horticulture and urban agriculture.

In 2010, the Corporate Roundtable on Sustainability was established to encourage companies to act sustainably.

Budburst
BudBurst is a nationwide initiative to help scientists understand the effects of climate change on plants by recording the timing of leafing, flowering, and fruiting (also known as phenological events), of a variety of plant species. The project started as a three-month pilot program in 2007. Thousands of observations have been amassed in subsequent years from students, gardeners, and others citizen scientists in all 50 states. When combined with other studies on insects, birds, and other pollinators, BudBurst aims to help scientists measure asynchronous plant-pollinator activities in light of climate change.

Honors and awards
In 2006, the Chicago Botanic Garden received the 'Award for Garden Excellence', given yearly by the APGA and Horticulture magazine to a public garden that exemplifies the highest standards of horticultural practices and has shown a commitment to supporting and demonstrating best gardening practices.

In 2012, The Chicago Botanic Garden was chosen as one of 10 "Great Place" (Public Space) for providing food locally, excellence in design, education and outreach, and sustainability by the American Planning Association, which selects "Great Places" in the United States annually to highlight good places for people to work and to live, representing a "true sense of place, cultural and historical interest".

See also
 List of botanical gardens in the United States
 List of Museums and Cultural Institutions in Chicago
 Morton Arboretum
 North American Plant Collections Consortium
 American Garden Rose Selections

References

Further reading
 
 
 
 https://web.archive.org/web/20130413112334/http://deerfield.suntimes.com/news/10256211-418/chicago-botanic-garden-has-a-good-year.html
 https://web.archive.org/web/20130225055047/http://www.chicagotribune.com/topic/travel/tourism-leisure/gardens-parks/chicago-botanic-garden-PLCUL000132.topic

External links

 
 Forest Preserve District of Cook County

Botanical gardens in Illinois
Parks in Cook County, Illinois
Birdwatching sites in the United States
Gene banks
Glencoe, Illinois
Buildings and structures in Cook County, Illinois
Japanese-American culture in Illinois
Japanese gardens in the United States
Institutions accredited by the American Alliance of Museums
Tourist attractions in Cook County, Illinois
Greenhouses in Illinois
1972 establishments in Illinois